It's a Mystery is the fifteenth studio album by American singer-songwriter Bob Seger, released in 1995 (see 1995 in music).  As with his prior album, it is credited to the Silver Bullet Band, though many of the tracks feature a wide array of session musicians and the members of the Silver Bullet Band itself only make limited contributions to the album.

Despite hit singles and fan favorites such as "Lock and Load," "Manhattan," and "Hands in the Air," the album charted at No. 27 on The Billboard charts. This was Seger's lowest chart position since 1976's Live Bullet which charted at No. 34 on the Billboard 200.

It's a Mystery was Seger's last album before taking a hiatus from the music industry to be with his family. He would return in 2006 with the album Face the Promise.

Track listing

Personnel
As listed in the liner notes.
Bob Seger – synthesizer (1, 8), acoustic guitar (3, 8), guitar (1), piano (9, 11), bass (1), vocals (all tracks), drum machine (1, 8)
Kenny Aronoff – drums (6)
Eddie Bayers – drums (2)
Roy Bittan – piano (3–5)
George Bohanon – trombone (10)
Rosemary Butler – background vocals (1–3, 5, 9)
Chris Campbell – bass (2, 6, 7, 12) 
Sam Clayton – maracas (7)
Scott Crago – bass drum (6)
Laura Creamer – background vocals (1–3, 5, 6, 9)
Craig Frost – synthesizer (6), keyboards (2, 12), electric piano (7), drum machine (7, 12)
Donny Gerrard – background vocals (1, 3, 5, 6, 9)
Bob Glaub – bass (3–5, 9, 11)
Richie Hayward – drums (10)
Russ Kunkel – drums (9, 11)
Gary Mallaber – brushed snare drum (10)
Tim Mitchell – guitar (2, 6, 7, 9, 12)
Shaun Murphy – background vocals (1, 2, 6, 9)
Buell Neidlinger – bass (10)
Bill Payne – synthesizer (7)
Alto Reed – saxophone (1–3, 7)
Rudy Richman – percussion (10)
Tom Roady – maracas (7, 12)
Harry Stinson – drums (3–5)
Fred Tackett – guitar (10)
Michael Thompson – guitar (3–5, 11)
Jeffrey C.J. Vanston – synthesizer (5, 11), keyboards (3, 4)
Rick Vito – slide guitar (10)
Julia Waters – background vocals (3, 5)
Luther Waters – background vocals (2)
Oren Waters – background vocals (6)

Production
Producer: Bob Seger
Engineer: David N. Cole
Mixing: David N. Cole
Drum programming: Bob Seger

Charts

Weekly charts

Year-end charts

Singles

References

Bob Seger albums
1995 albums
Capitol Records albums